The 2002 Wandsworth London Borough Council election took place on 2 May 2002 to elect members of Wandsworth London Borough Council in London, England. The whole council was up for election with boundary changes since the last election in 1998 reducing the number of seats by 1. The Conservative party stayed in overall control of the council.

The election saw an experiment in leaving polling stations open for a longer period. Along with neighbouring Westminster City Council polling stations were open from 7am to 10pm instead of the standard 8am to 9pm.

Election result

Ward results

References

2002 London Borough council elections
2002